Pacaraos Quechua is a variety of Quechua spoken until the middle of the 20th century in the community of Pacaraos (Pacaraos District) in the Peruvian Lima Region in the Chancay valley up to 3000 m above sea level.

The Quechua of Pacaraos was investigated by the Dutch linguist Willem F. H. Adelaar in the 1970s, when it was still spoken by women in their sixties and older. Around the year 2000 there were possibly no active speakers left, but there are probably some people with passive knowledge who grew up with their grandparents.

A peculiarity of Pacaraos Quechua is that it does not belong to any of the two main branches of the Quechua family (Waywash and Wampuy). In contrast to other Quechua varieties, the Quechua of Pacaraos has phonemic word accent, which is either on the penultimate or the ultimate syllable. Like the Waywash varieties but in contrast to Wampuy, it distinguishes between short and long vowels.

The first person of the verb and the possessive form for nouns is expressed by accent on the last syllable and addition of -y, e.g.: tarpuy "to sow" (root: tarpu-) - tarpúy "I sow" (cf. Waywash: , Wampuy: tarpuni) - tarpunki "you sow" - tarpun "he/she sows".

The vocabulary of Pacaraos Quechua corresponds in part with Southern Quechua (e.g. kunan "now"), and partially with Waywash (e.g. yarku- "to rise", akshu, "potato"). Furthermore there are many loanwords from Jaqaru or other Aymaran languages (e.g. achara "old", uni- "to hate", wilka "sun"). Some words of Pacaraos Quechua are unique, e.g. arapu- "to answer",  "clothes",  "both".

The accusative suffix -kta has a long form -kta and a short form -k, the latter being combined with final stress. The negation suffix -su (<*-chu) is often shortened to -s.

The gerund is expressed with -shpa, as in all Wampuy varieties.

The /q/ of Proto-Quechua is a fricative, at the end of a syllable or near a voiceless consonant it is voiceless [x] and otherwise voiced [g]. In contrast to other Quechua varianties it distinguishes between a simple [r] (tap, e.g.  "they both") and a vibrant [rr] (e.g. rraqak "girl"). As in some dialects of Ancash Quechua /č/ has become [s] (e.g. say "that") and /s/ has turned to [h] (e.g. huti "name", haĉa "plant",  "snow"). The retroflex /ĉ/ has been preserved.

Bibliography 
 Adelaar, Willem. 1987. Morfología del Quechua de Pacaraos. Lima, Universidad Nacional Mayor de San Marcos.
 Willem F. H. Adelaar, Pieter Muysken (2006). The languages of the Andes, pp. 242–249. A sketch of a Peruvian Quechua Dialect (Pacaraos).

References

Languages of Peru
Quechuan languages